Jacques-Émile Dubois (13 April 1920 – 2 April 2005) was a French chemist.

In 1981, Dubois became a founding member of the World Cultural Council.

References

1920 births
2005 deaths
French Resistance members
20th-century French chemists
Founding members of the World Cultural Council
Library science scholars